Edison, the Man is a 1940 biographical film depicting the life of inventor Thomas Edison, who was played by Spencer Tracy. Hugo Butler and Dore Schary were nominated for the Academy Award for Best Writing, Original Story for their work on this film.  However, much of the film's script fictionalizes or exaggerates the real events of Edison's life.

The film was the second of a complementary pair of Edison biopics released by Metro-Goldwyn-Mayer in 1940. Young Tom Edison, starring Mickey Rooney, was released two months earlier and told the story of Edison's youth.

Plot
In 1869, anxious to be more than a tramp telegraph operator, Edison travels to New York at the prompting of an old friend, Bunt Cavatt. He goes to work for Mr. Els.  He tries to persuade financier Mr. Taggart to fund the development of his inventions, but Taggart has no interest in financing “green electrical workers”. However, General Powell, the president of Western Union, does.

Edison eventually sells his invention of an improved ticker tape machine to Taggart and Powell for $40,000, enabling him to get married and open his own laboratory at Menlo Park.  In the next few years, he invents the phonograph with the help of his devoted staff.

Trouble arises when Bunt brags to reporters that Edison has invented the electric light.  Since he hasn't yet, he is condemned by the scientific community (encouraged by Taggart, whose gas stocks are threatened by the announcement). Edison “leaves science behind”, and with a Herculean trial-and-error effort, finally succeeds in inventing a practical electric light.  His subsequent plans to light New York are again hindered by Taggart, who arranges it so that Edison is given only six months to complete the entire task. Nevertheless, Edison finishes the job just in time.

Cast

 Spencer Tracy as Thomas Alva Edison
 Rita Johnson as Mary Stillwell
 Charles Coburn as General Powell
 Gene Lockhart as Mr. Taggart
 Henry Travers as Ben Els
 Lynne Overman as James J. 'Bunt' Cavatt
 Felix Bressart as Michael Simon, Edison's assistant
 Gene Reynolds as Jimmy Price
 Byron Foulger as Edwin Hall
 Peter Godfrey as Bob Ashton
 Guy D'Ennery as Lundstrom
 Milton Parsons as 'Acid' Graham
 Addison Richards as Mr. Johnson
 Paul Hurst as Sheriff
 Philo McCullough as Assistant (uncredited) 
 Charles Trowbridge as Clark (uncredited)

Quotes
“I’m an inventor. I can’t be told what to do. I’ve got to do the things I want to do. I work with ideas, visionary things. Nobody—not even I—knows how useful they’re going to be or how profitable until I had a chance to work them out in my own way.”

“You think you’re nothing but wood and metal and glass. But you’re not: you’re dreams and hard work and heart. You’d better not disappoint us.”

“It’s not the money wrapped up in the laboratory, it’s the lives wrapped up in the laboratory.  It’s come to mean everything that I ever set out to do. It means a weekly paycheck for all my men. It means home, shelter, clothing, and food for lots of families.”

“He hasn’t got a darn thing but I like to hear him talk that way.”

Reception
Bosley Crowther of The New York Times praised Tracy's performance for bringing "human and vital substantiality" to the role, but criticized the film for its historical inaccuracies: "When Metro deliberately distorts certain important details in Edison's career and boldly invents others—even though it were done with the sanction of his family—the question arises as to whether this creation is intended to be a reliable portrait of the great inventor or just another fellow who looks something like him. Frankly, we think it wiser to regard it in the second light." Variety called the film "a top-bracket picture from Metro that takes its place among the more important biographical contributions by the screen." Harrison's Reports wrote: "As in Young Tom Edison, this offers good entertainment for both young and old, in spite of the fact that the action is not particularly fast-moving. In a way it is even better than the first picture, for the older Edison is more interesting, and the work he accomplishes is far more exciting." Film Daily called it "one of the truly memorable pictures of the year" and predicted it would "command most serious consideration" when it came time to vote for the Academy Awards. John Mosher of The New Yorker wrote that even though the story of Edison's career was "not really screen material ... more than one might think, its interest mounts with the advance of the picture and some actual excitement is achieved at last."

The film is recognized by American Film Institute in these lists:
 2006: AFI's 100 Years...100 Cheers – Nominated

Box office
According to MGM records the film earned $1,152,000 in the US and Canada and $635,000 elsewhere resulting in a profit of $143,000.

References

External links
 
 
 
 

1940 films
1940s biographical films
1940s historical films
American biographical films
American historical films
Biographical films about scientists
Cultural depictions of Thomas Edison
American black-and-white films
Films about technology
Films directed by Clarence Brown
Films scored by Herbert Stothart
Films set in New Jersey
Films set in New York (state)
Metro-Goldwyn-Mayer films
American sequel films
Works about Thomas Edison
Films set in 1869
Films set in the 1870s
Films set in the 1880s
1940s English-language films
1940s American films